Claude Zdanow (born Long Island, New York) is an American musician, composer, engineer, and entrepreneur. Active in the music industry since 2005, he toured with pop punk band Patent Pending as a bassist in 2006, and is best known for founding the Stadiumred Group in 2007, a marketing agency holding company in New York City.

The first Stadiumred business was a recording studio company, Stadiumred Studios, that had producers such as Omen and Just Blaze on staff, and was associated with over twenty Grammy Award-winning projects including Steven Mackey’s Dreamhouse (2010 Best Engineered Album, Classical). Clients included Eminem, Drake, and Jeremy Carr among others, until Stadiumred Studios ceased operations in 2015.

Today, Claude oversees the Stadiumred Group's four operating subsidiaries SevenBlue, Gyrosity Projects, MagicBullet Media & Stadiumred Europe. Claude's entrepreneurial efforts have also led him to expand Stadiumred's holdings to include a portfolio of venture startups under the Stadiumred Ventures brand such as LIQS Cocktail Shots, The Audio Hunt, Crosshair Music, Scoremofo and The Marse Group.

Zdanow is a periodic angel investor, advising and funding companies. He has been invited to speak as an industry expert at events such as Winter Music Conference, Organization of American States, Amsterdam Dance Event, and ASCAP I Create Music Expo, and has appeared in media outlets such as Rolling Stone, MarketWatch, Bloomberg TV, and MSN.

Music career

1990s-2006: Early years, RockIT Studios
Claude Zdanow was born in the United States and raised in Long Island, New York. He began attending Portledge School in 1992, in Locust Valley, New York. By his teens he was a songwriter and musician, learning instruments such as bass guitar, piano, as well as audio engineering.

While still attending high school, he founded RockIT Studios at age fifteen. The one-person operation resulted from both his interest in music technology and his involvement with the music scene, as at the time he was writing, producing, and performing with several local bands. He constructed the small studio in his parents' basement in Long Island, officially opening in December 2005. Through RockIT he ended up working on several major-label projects, and among his clients were Evan and Jaron, The Dear Hunter, Warner Brothers, Maybelline Cosmetics and IMG Media.

2006-present: Move to Manhattan

After graduating high school from Portledge School in 2006, Zdanow moved to New York City to attend college, working in event promotions and as a composer for television. He was soon approached by the pop punk band Patent Pending. He joined as bass guitarist for their 2006 tour, touring the United States for five months and sharing gigs with bands such as Zebrahead, Catch-22 and Authority Zero.

After the tour, in 2006 he returned to attend Marymount Manhattan College. While at Marymount he was involved in college radio and student government, and also studied political science, philosophy, and business. He closed RockIT Studios in June 2007, founding his next studio, Stadiumred Studios, in Manhattan just a month later. He dropped out of Marymount in 2008, instead working full-time at his studio.

Since his move to Manhattan Zdanow has continued to work as a record producer and engineer for artists in genres such as EDM, hip hop, blues,  R&B, and rock.  He has also continued his work as a composer. He joined back up with Patent Pending for a single concert during the 2010 CMJ Music Marathon & Film: Stadiumred and ZS Events Showcase, which he had put together in partnership with Zach Iser, now an agent at ICM Partners, to launch Stadiumred's event company Stadiumred Life. In 2011 he mixed a project featuring Usher and Justin Bieber; produced by Mysto & Pizzi, the song was released on Ultra Records for the American Cancer Society. As of 2013 he also personally co-manages Jeremy Carr and The Chainsmokers.

Stadiumred Group

Founding and companies
In the summer of 2007, Zdanow was nineteen years old when he closed RockIT Studios and decided to start a new company. He took over what once was Harmolodic studios in Harlem, originally used and owned by free jazz artist Ornette Coleman. Zdanow largely renovated the broken down space himself, also recruiting friends and family to help. He opened the Stadiumred Group's first business Stadiumred Studios in September 2007, with himself as the only employee. After dropping out of college in 2008 to work at the studio full-time, he soon began hiring producers, engineers, and managers. As of 2014 Stadiumred Studios was a full-service mixing, recording, and production facility, associated with 24 Grammy nominations and 12 wins. According to Stadiumred's website, the Stadiumred Group is now a global marketing agency holding company. Zdanow is CEO of the parent company Stadiumred Inc., which as of 2019 has owned and managed multiple other companies since inception, four of which are listed below:
 Stadiumred Studios - recording studio company (ceased operations in 2015)
 Stadiumred Music - artist development company responsible for The Chainsmokers, Jeremy Carr, and others (became Music Publishing Company in 2014, a company focusing on content placement in film, television shows, trailers, etc.)
 Stadiumred Life - an experiential marketing agency focused medium to large companies across a range of sectors. Clients have included Pernod Ricard USA, Rolls-Royce, Anheuser-Busch, and others. (In 2018 merged with Werkshop Branding to create SevenBlue)
 Stadiumred Europe - a European business development company focused on helping European based companies in their expansion to the United States.
 Gyrosity Projects - a Nashville-based digital marketing agency acquired in June 2018.
 SevenBlue - a branding, creative, and experiential marketing agency resulting from the merger of the acquisition of Werkshop Branding in August 2018 and its merger with Stadiumred Life.
 MagicBullet Media - a New York and Los Angeles based content marketing agency acquired in November 2018.

Stadiumred Studios

Producers and clients

Zdanow soon expanded the company from being a one-man operation, and by early 2009 employees included rock engineer Joseph Pedulla, hip-hop engineer Ariel Borujow and classical engineer Tom Lazarus. By that time Stadiumred Studios was also editing video for commercials, with video editors on staff. Sidney "Omen" Brown soon joined as a record producer as well, and in February 2010 it was announced that Justin "Just Blaze" Smith was moving to Stadiumred Studios, after closing his own studio Baseline that month. Just Blaze and Zdanow combined resources for an expansion, and among other additions, a mastering suite was added in late 2010 for new mastering engineer Ricardo Gutierrez, with the other producers retaining their residencies. By April 2011 the Stadiumred staff included classical producer David Frost.

By 2010 Stadiumred Music existed and was developing, managing and recording both DJs and recording artists. Stadiumred Studios had also recorded music for the 20th Anniversary episode of The Simpsons. At that point clients had included Melinda Doolittle, Mos Def, Yo Yo Ma, and Thursday. Stadiumred Studios engineer Tom Lazarus mixed at Stadiumred Studios for Oliver Stone's film W, as well as for the San Francisco Symphony. The latter was filmed for Blu-ray and recorded live in San Francisco, then mixed at Stadiumred Studios. In 2011 Stadiumred Studios worked on The Greatest Story Never Told, the debut album by hip hop artist Saigon. The album was recorded, produced, mixed and mastered at Stadiumred Studios, and when released it reached No. 7 on Billboard's Hip Hop Albums Chart.

The company worked on four Grammy-winning projects in its first three years of operation, including a 2010 win for Best Instrumental Soloist Performance (without orchestra) for Journey to the New World by Sharon Isbin. In 2010 alone they were involved in eleven Grammy-nominated projects spanning nine categories, including Eminem’s Recovery (Album of the Year, Best Rap Album) produced and mixed by Just Blaze, Drake’s Thank Me Later (Best Rap Album, Best New Artist), and Steven Mackey’s Dreamhouse (Best Classical Album, Best Orchestral Performance, and Best Engineered Album, Classical). By 2010 the company had several dozen gold and platinum albums and several Oscars, Emmys and Tonys, and by 2014 Stadiumred Studios was associated with 24 Grammy nominations and eleven wins.

Notable releases
Albums and singles recorded, produced, or mixed at Stadiumred Studios:

Equipment
Stadiumred Studios in Harlem has been renovated and expanded a number of times since it was taken over in 2007 as Harmolodic. Before March 2009 the studio underwent a renovation with consultation by Alan Fierstein of Acoustilog, retouching the 900-square-foot live room and 400-square-foot control room, with three side rooms available for recording and mixing. At the time Zdanow was using his own Digidesign mixing board, specifically a "32-fader Digidesign ICON D-Control ES with 7.1 capability." The ICON was integrated with Pro Tools, though Stadiumred Studios also uses Logic Studio and other digital audio workstations as well.

In early 2010 Zdanow commissioned Frank Comentale to design a 2,500 square-foot expansion. Comentale, who had previously worked on sites such as The Hit Factory, constructed two new rooms: a SSL mix studio and a mastering studio with surround sound. According to Zdanow, "By keeping it smaller we could keep it more affordable. Clients have the SSL, a full suite of plug-ins, Augspurgers – everything that would usually cost you $2500 or more a day, at the fraction of the cost. This place is small enough to feel like a production room, but big enough to feel like a room you can mix comfortably in." The "A" room in the studio is "a big live room where people can track through the console, and mix with tons of outboard gear." The "B" room as of late 2010 was being used by Just Blaze for production, with a customized SSLAWS setup. More specifically, the new B-Room was given "SSL AWS 900, Augspurger mains, and a digital/analog hybrid production/mix approach." Studio C4 as of 2010 is used by resident engineer Ariel Borujow, who encouraged the studio to purchase Dangerous Music equipment, which as of 2011 are used in both the A and C4 studios.

Investments, public speaking
Zdanow is a periodic angel investor, and is an advisor and investor to Quirky and DJZ Inc., both tech companies. He is also an advisor for the Alzheimer's Disease Resource Center and a member of the Portledge Preparatory Arts Council.

He is a member of various music industry organizations as well. A supporter of The Recording Academy, he is co-chair of the Grammy Camp Committee and in 2013 Zdanow both helped organize the day and was also on the Grammy Camp panel at Pace University, focusing his talk on music and social media. A frequent public speaker since founding Stadiumred, he has appeared as an industry expert at events such as the 2011 Winter Music Conference, and has been invited to speak at the Organization of American States, Pro Audio Summit, Amsterdam Dance Event, Grammy-U, and ASCAP I Create Music Expo. In April 2014 he was an industry expert at Columbia Business School’s Startup Demo Night #23, which focused on media and entertainment. He has also appeared in television shows and print publications such as Bloomberg TV, Rolling Stone, MarketWatch, and MSN.

Discography

Production credits

See also
List of record labels

References

Further reading

External links
Stadiumred.com
Claude Zdanow Discography at Allmusic
Claude Zdanow Discography at Discogs

Living people
People from Locust Valley, New York
Year of birth missing (living people)
Musicians from New York (state)
American chief executives
Marymount Manhattan College alumni